The Estonian Church may refer to:

The Estonian Evangelical Lutheran Church
The Estonian Apostolic Orthodox Church, also officially known as the Orthodox Church of Estonia.
The Estonian Orthodox Church of the Moscow Patriarchate